Ignotum per ignotius (Latin for "the unknown by the more unknown") describes an explanation that is less familiar than the concept it would explain.

An example would be: "The oven felt hot because of Fourier's Law." It is unlikely that a person unfamiliar with the hotness of ovens would be enlightened by a reference to a fundamental law of physics. Another example would be referencing Rayleigh scattering as an explanation for why the sky is blue, when a more apt explanation would be simply that air is blue. 

That said, since these explanations could enlighten people in theory, ignotum per ignotius is not strictly a logical fallacy; it is just a criticism of an argument on rhetorical grounds, stating that such an argument is not useful in a particular context.

Ignotum per æque ignotum
Ignotum per æque ignotum, meaning "the unknown by the equally unknown", is a related form of fallacy in which one attempts to prove something unknown by deducing it from something else that is also not known to be true.

See also 
 List of Latin phrases

References

Latin logical phrases
Ignorance